Belgentier is a commune in the Var department in the Provence-Alpes-Côte d'Azur region in southeastern France.

It was the birthplace of the astronomer, antiquary and savant, Nicolas-Claude Fabri de Peiresc (1580–1637).

See also
Communes of the Var department

References

Communes of Var (department)